Jimmy Prendergast (born 1949 in Oulart, County Wexford) is a former Irish sportsman.  He played hurling with his local club Oulart–The Ballagh and was a member of the Wexford senior inter-county team from 1972 until 1978.His son Lar Prendergast plays hurling for Wexford.

References

1949 births
Living people
Oulart-the-Ballagh hurlers
Wexford inter-county hurlers